The 1994–95 Macedonian First League was the 3rd season of the Macedonian First Football League, the highest football league of Macedonia. The first matches of the season were played on 14 August 1994 and the last on 18 June 1995. Vardar defended their championship title, having won their third title in a row.

Promotion and relegation 

1 Karaorman was relegated from the First League after a loss in a relegation tie-breaker match against Borec.
2 Pobeda Valandovo was initially promoted, but was expelled from the First League due to unknown reasons.

Participating teams

League table

Results

Top goalscorers

See also 
 1994–95 Macedonian Football Cup
 1994–95 Macedonian Second Football League

References

External links 
 Macedonia - List of final tables (RSSSF)
 Football Federation of Macedonia

Macedonia
1
Macedonian First Football League seasons